In geometry, the midpoint polygon of a polygon  is the polygon whose vertices are the midpoints of the edges of . It is sometimes called the Kasner polygon after Edward Kasner, who termed it the inscribed polygon "for brevity".

Examples

Triangle
The midpoint polygon of a triangle is called the medial triangle. It shares the same centroid and medians with the original triangle. The perimeter of the medial triangle equals the semiperimeter of the original triangle, and the area is one quarter of the area of the original triangle. This can be proven by the midpoint theorem of triangles and Heron's formula. The orthocenter of the medial triangle coincides with the circumcenter of the original triangle.

Quadrilateral
The midpoint polygon of a quadrilateral is a parallelogram called its Varignon parallelogram. If the quadrilateral is simple, the area of the parallelogram is one half the area of the original quadrilateral. The perimeter of the parallelogram equals the sum of the diagonals of the original quadrilateral.

See also
Circulant matrix
Midpoint-stretching polygon
Varignon's theorem

References

Further reading

External links

Polygons